Miloš Šestić (born 8 August 1956) is a former Yugoslav and Serbian professional footballer who played as a forward.

Early life
Born in Milosavci, a village near Laktaši (in present-day Republika Srpska, an entity of Bosnia and Herzegovina), Šestić grew up in Stara Pazova (in present-day Vojvodina, an autonomous province of Serbia), making his first football steps at local club Jedinstvo.

Club career
After joining the youth system of Red Star Belgrade, Šestić made his senior debut in late April 1974 (away against Olimpija Ljubljana and at home versus Čelik Zenica). He spent the following 10 years at the club, winning four Yugoslav First League titles (1977, 1980, 1981, and 1984) and one Yugoslav Cup (1982). In the winter of 1985, Šestić moved abroad to Greek club Olympiacos, spending the next two years in Athens. He subsequently returned to his homeland and joined Vojvodina. After helping them win the Yugoslav Second League in 1987, Šestić eventually won the national championship with Vojvodina in the 1988–89 season.

International career
At international level, Šestić was a member of the Yugoslavia national team at one European Championship (1984) and one World Cup (1982). He also represented his country at one Olympic Games (1980) and one Mediterranean Games (1979), winning the gold medal at the latter tournament.

Statistics

Club

International

International goals
Scores and results list Yugoslavia's goal tally first.

Honours

Club
Red Star Belgrade
 Yugoslav First League: 1976–77, 1979–80, 1980–81, 1983–84
 Yugoslav Cup: 1981–82
 UEFA Cup: Runner-up 1978–79
Vojvodina
 Yugoslav First League: 1988–89
 Yugoslav Second League: 1986–87
Zemun
 Yugoslav Second League: 1989–90

International
Yugoslavia
 UEFA Under-21 Championship: 1978
 Mediterranean Games: 1979

References

External links
 
 
 

1982 FIFA World Cup players
Association football forwards
Competitors at the 1979 Mediterranean Games
Expatriate footballers in Greece
FK Vojvodina players
FK Zemun players
Footballers at the 1980 Summer Olympics
Mediterranean Games gold medalists for Yugoslavia
Mediterranean Games medalists in football
OFK Beograd players
Olympiacos F.C. players
Olympic footballers of Yugoslavia
Red Star Belgrade footballers
Serbian footballers
Serbs of Bosnia and Herzegovina
Super League Greece players
UEFA Euro 1984 players
Yugoslav expatriate footballers
Yugoslav expatriate sportspeople in Greece
Yugoslav First League players
Yugoslav footballers
Yugoslavia international footballers
Yugoslavia under-21 international footballers
1956 births
Living people